Chester Otto Carrier (May 5, 1897 – September 24, 1980) was a U.S. Representative from Kentucky.

Born on a farm near Brownsville, Edmonson, Kentucky, Carrier attended the public schools of Grayson County, Kentucky, West Virginia University, and was graduated from the law department of the University of Louisville in 1924.
He engaged in ranching in Wyoming for one year and took up railroading in Pennsylvania in 1920. He was admitted to the bar in 1923 and commenced practice in Leitchfield, Kentucky. He served as county attorney of Grayson County from 1925 to 1943.

Carrier was elected as a Republican to the Seventy-eighth Congress to fill the vacancy caused by the death of Edward W. Creal and served from November 30, 1943, to January 3, 1945.
He was an unsuccessful candidate for reelection in 1944 to the Seventy-ninth Congress.
He resumed the practice of law in Leitchfield.
He retired to North Seminole, Florida, where he died September 24, 1980.
He was interred in Clarkson Baptist Cemetery, Clarkson, Kentucky.

References

1897 births
1980 deaths
Republican Party members of the United States House of Representatives from Kentucky
People from Grayson County, Kentucky
People from Leitchfield, Kentucky
20th-century American politicians